David Livingstone (1813–1873) was a Scottish explorer of Africa and Congregationalist pioneer medical missionary.

David Livingstone may also refer to:
David Livingstone (film), a 1936 British historical adventure film
David Livingstone (cricketer) (1927–2011), Scottish cricketer
David N. Livingstone (born 1953), British historian
David Livingstone (broadcaster), broadcaster for Sky Sports in the UK
 David Livingstone, producer of the 2014 film Pride

See also
David Livingston, American television producer and director
David Livingston (politician), member of the Arizona House of Representatives
David Livingston (tennis) (born 1962), American former tennis player
David M. Livingston, American oncologist
David Livingstone Centre, a biographical museum in Blantyre, South Lanarkshire, Scotland
David Livingstone Elementary School
David Livingstone Primary

Livingstone, David